Stanley "Stan" Dobson was a New Zealand professional rugby league footballer who played in the 1920s.

Playing career

International honours
Stan Dobson represented New Zealand in 1920 against Great Britain.

References

New Zealand national rugby league team players
New Zealand rugby league players
Place of birth missing
Place of death missing
Rugby league centres
Wellington rugby league team players
Year of birth missing
Year of death missing